Jennifer McMahon may refer to:

Jennifer McMahon (nutritionist), New Zealand nutritionist
Jennifer McMahon (swimmer) in Aquatics at the 1990 Commonwealth Games
Jennifer McMahon (writer), American writer
Jennifer McMahon, character in Colony (TV series)

See also
Jenna McMahon, American writer, producer, actress and comedian